The Krasnodar constituency (No.46) is a Russian legislative constituency in Krasnodar Krai. The constituency covers eastern Krasnodar and its suburbs.

Members elected

Election results

1993

|-
! colspan=2 style="background-color:#E9E9E9;text-align:left;vertical-align:top;" |Candidate
! style="background-color:#E9E9E9;text-align:left;vertical-align:top;" |Party
! style="background-color:#E9E9E9;text-align:right;" |Votes
! style="background-color:#E9E9E9;text-align:right;" |%
|-
|style="background-color:"|
|align=left|Sergey Glotov
|align=left|Independent
|
|24.82%
|-
| colspan="5" style="background-color:#E9E9E9;"|
|- style="font-weight:bold"
| colspan="3" style="text-align:left;" | Total
| 
| 100%
|-
| colspan="5" style="background-color:#E9E9E9;"|
|- style="font-weight:bold"
| colspan="4" |Source:
|
|}

1995

|-
! colspan=2 style="background-color:#E9E9E9;text-align:left;vertical-align:top;" |Candidate
! style="background-color:#E9E9E9;text-align:left;vertical-align:top;" |Party
! style="background-color:#E9E9E9;text-align:right;" |Votes
! style="background-color:#E9E9E9;text-align:right;" |%
|-
|style="background-color:"|
|align=left|Sergey Glotov (incumbent)
|align=left|Power to the People!
|
|25.49%
|-
|style="background-color:"|
|align=left|Igor Khankoyev
|align=left|Our Home – Russia
|
|12.05%
|-
|style="background-color:"|
|align=left|Mikhail Veligodsky
|align=left|Yabloko
|
|9.36%
|-
|style="background-color:#3A46CE"|
|align=left|Lidia Fedoseyeva-Shukshina
|align=left|Democratic Choice of Russia – United Democrats
|
|6.14%
|-
|style="background-color:#D50000"|
|align=left|Viktor Danyarov
|align=left|Communists and Working Russia - for the Soviet Union
|
|5.95%
|-
|style="background-color:"|
|align=left|Vyacheslav Paliyenko
|align=left|Independent
|
|5.82%
|-
|style="background-color:"|
|align=left|Vyacheslav Gushcha
|align=left|Independent
|
|5.44%
|-
|style="background-color:#00A44E"|
|align=left|Konstantin Frolov
|align=left|Bloc '89
|
|4.75%
|-
|style="background-color:"|
|align=left|Aleksandr Travnikov
|align=left|Independent
|
|3.33%
|-
|style="background-color:#F5821F"|
|align=left|Mikhail Tarasov
|align=left|Bloc of Independents
|
|2.33%
|-
|style="background-color:"|
|align=left|Vardeks Ayrapetyan
|align=left|Kedr
|
|2.13%
|-
|style="background-color:"|
|align=left|Vasily Trotsenko
|align=left|Agrarian Party
|
|1.35%
|-
|style="background-color:"|
|align=left|Sergey Batura
|align=left|Independent
|
|1.29%
|-
|style="background-color:#1C1A0D"|
|align=left|Vyacheslav Burakov
|align=left|Forward, Russia!
|
|1.17%
|-
|style="background-color:#0D0900"|
|align=left|Olga Solodovnikova
|align=left|People's Union
|
|0.85%
|-
|style="background-color:"|
|align=left|Lyubov Shusharina
|align=left|Independent
|
|0.79%
|-
|style="background-color:"|
|align=left|Konstantin Pleshakov
|align=left|Independent
|
|0.66%
|-
|style="background-color:"|
|align=left|Boris Zimin
|align=left|Independent
|
|0.57%
|-
|style="background-color:#000000"|
|colspan=2 |against all
|
|8.75%
|-
| colspan="5" style="background-color:#E9E9E9;"|
|- style="font-weight:bold"
| colspan="3" style="text-align:left;" | Total
| 
| 100%
|-
| colspan="5" style="background-color:#E9E9E9;"|
|- style="font-weight:bold"
| colspan="4" |Source:
|
|}

1999

|-
! colspan=2 style="background-color:#E9E9E9;text-align:left;vertical-align:top;" |Candidate
! style="background-color:#E9E9E9;text-align:left;vertical-align:top;" |Party
! style="background-color:#E9E9E9;text-align:right;" |Votes
! style="background-color:#E9E9E9;text-align:right;" |%
|-
|style="background-color:"|
|align=left|Igor Khankoyev
|align=left|Independent
|
|30.90%
|-
|style="background-color:"|
|align=left|Sergey Glotov (incumbent)
|align=left|Russian All-People's Union
|
|23.60%
|-
|style="background-color:"|
|align=left|Vasily Gromov
|align=left|Independent
|
|13.79%
|-
|style="background-color:"|
|align=left|Mikhail Veligodsvky
|align=left|Yabloko
|
|8.42%
|-
|style="background-color:"|
|align=left|Georgy Muradov
|align=left|Independent
|
|4.60%
|-
|style="background-color:"|
|align=left|Yury Konogray
|align=left|Independent
|
|2.29%
|-
|style="background-color:"|
|align=left|Aleksandr Travnikov
|align=left|Independent
|
|1.93%
|-
|style="background-color:"|
|align=left|Ivan Ozerov
|align=left|Independent
|
|1.92%
|-
|style="background-color:"|
|align=left|Ildus Salimzhanov
|align=left|Liberal Democratic Party
|
|1.31%
|-
|style="background-color:#084284"|
|align=left|Vyacheslav Grishin
|align=left|Spiritual Heritage
|
|0.84%
|-
|style="background-color:#020266"|
|align=left|Aleksandr Gorshkov
|align=left|Russian Socialist Party
|
|0.64%
|-
|style="background-color:#000000"|
|colspan=2 |against all
|
|8.66%
|-
| colspan="5" style="background-color:#E9E9E9;"|
|- style="font-weight:bold"
| colspan="3" style="text-align:left;" | Total
| 
| 100%
|-
| colspan="5" style="background-color:#E9E9E9;"|
|- style="font-weight:bold"
| colspan="4" |Source:
|
|}

2003

|-
! colspan=2 style="background-color:#E9E9E9;text-align:left;vertical-align:top;" |Candidate
! style="background-color:#E9E9E9;text-align:left;vertical-align:top;" |Party
! style="background-color:#E9E9E9;text-align:right;" |Votes
! style="background-color:#E9E9E9;text-align:right;" |%
|-
|style="background-color:"|
|align=left|Boris Kazakov
|align=left|Independent
|
|18.58%
|-
|style="background-color:"|
|align=left|Mikhail Karakay
|align=left|United Russia
|
|14.52%
|-
|style="background-color: " |
|align=left|Gennady Loshkarev
|align=left|Communist Party
|
|13.17%
|-
|style="background-color: " |
|align=left|Sergey Glotov
|align=left|Rodina
|
|12.02%
|-
|style="background-color:"|
|align=left|Vladimir Izmaylov
|align=left|Independent
|
|11.02%
|-
|style="background-color:"|
|align=left|Yulia Kryazheva
|align=left|Liberal Democratic Party
|
|4.87%
|-
|style="background-color:#1042A5"|
|align=left|Stanislav Babin
|align=left|Union of Right Forces
|
|4.21%
|-
|style="background-color:#408080"|
|align=left|Sergey Markov
|align=left|For a Holy Russia
|
|1.82%
|-
|style="background-color:"|
|align=left|Mamikon Ayrapetyan
|align=left|Independent
|
|1.19%
|-
|style="background-color:"|
|align=left|Stanislav Kurkin
|align=left|Social Democratic Party
|
|0.81%
|-
|style="background-color:#000000"|
|colspan=2 |against all
|
|15.64%
|-
| colspan="5" style="background-color:#E9E9E9;"|
|- style="font-weight:bold"
| colspan="3" style="text-align:left;" | Total
| 
| 100%
|-
| colspan="5" style="background-color:#E9E9E9;"|
|- style="font-weight:bold"
| colspan="4" |Source:
|
|}

2016

|-
! colspan=2 style="background-color:#E9E9E9;text-align:left;vertical-align:top;" |Candidate
! style="background-color:#E9E9E9;text-align:left;vertical-align:top;" |Party
! style="background-color:#E9E9E9;text-align:right;" |Votes
! style="background-color:#E9E9E9;text-align:right;" |%
|-
|style="background-color: " |
|align=left|Vladimir Yevlanov
|align=left|United Russia
|
|50.52%
|-
|style="background-color:"|
|align=left|Sergey Obukhov
|align=left|Communist Party
|
|20.89%
|-
|style="background-color:"|
|align=left|Ilya Shakalov
|align=left|Liberal Democratic Party
|
|7.86%
|-
|style="background-color: "|
|align=left|Yury Kopachev
|align=left|Party of Growth
|
|4.41%
|-
|style="background-color:"|
|align=left|Daniel Bashmakov
|align=left|A Just Russia
|
|3.58%
|-
|style="background-color:"|
|align=left|Natalya Pogorelova
|align=left|Rodina
|
|3.46%
|-
|style="background:"| 
|align=left|Leonid Zaprudin
|align=left|People's Freedom Party
|
|2.07%
|-
|style="background-color:"|
|align=left|Andrey Yadchenko
|align=left|The Greens
|
|1.84%
|-
|style="background:"| 
|align=left|Mikhail Abramyan
|align=left|Communists of Russia
|
|1.72%
|-
|style="background:"| 
|align=left|Vitaly Katunin
|align=left|Patriots of Russia
|
|1.29%
|-
| colspan="5" style="background-color:#E9E9E9;"|
|- style="font-weight:bold"
| colspan="3" style="text-align:left;" | Total
| 
| 100%
|-
| colspan="5" style="background-color:#E9E9E9;"|
|- style="font-weight:bold"
| colspan="4" |Source:
|
|}

2021

|-
! colspan=2 style="background-color:#E9E9E9;text-align:left;vertical-align:top;" |Candidate
! style="background-color:#E9E9E9;text-align:left;vertical-align:top;" |Party
! style="background-color:#E9E9E9;text-align:right;" |Votes
! style="background-color:#E9E9E9;text-align:right;" |%
|-
|style="background-color: " |
|align=left|Yevgeny Pervyshov
|align=left|United Russia
|
|53.56%
|-
|style="background-color:"|
|align=left|Ivan Zhilishchikov
|align=left|Communist Party
|
|18.61%
|-
|style="background-color: " |
|align=left|Oleg Boyarinov
|align=left|New People
|
|6.24%
|-
|style="background-color:"|
|align=left|Gennady Ufimtsev
|align=left|A Just Russia — For Truth
|
|5.55%
|-
|style="background-color:"|
|align=left|Ivan Tutushkin
|align=left|Liberal Democratic Party
|
|3.68%
|-
|style="background-color:"|
|align=left|Marina Zakharova
|align=left|The Greens
|
|2.47%
|-
|style="background-color: "|
|align=left|Vyacheslav Demkin
|align=left|Party of Pensioners
|
|2.47%
|-
|style="background-color: "|
|align=left|Maksim Barinov
|align=left|Party of Growth
|
|1.66%
|-
|style="background-color:"|
|align=left|Vladimir Volynsky
|align=left|Rodina
|
|1.54%
|-
|style="background-color: "|
|align=left|Akhmed Besleney
|align=left|Yabloko
|
|1.14%
|-
|style="background-color:"|
|align=left|Sergey Voskoboynikov
|align=left|Civic Platform
|
|1.00%
|-
| colspan="5" style="background-color:#E9E9E9;"|
|- style="font-weight:bold"
| colspan="3" style="text-align:left;" | Total
| 
| 100%
|-
| colspan="5" style="background-color:#E9E9E9;"|
|- style="font-weight:bold"
| colspan="4" |Source:
|
|}

Notes

References

Russian legislative constituencies
Politics of Krasnodar Krai